Jouy-lès-Reims (literally Jouy near Reims) is a commune in the Marne department of north-eastern France.

See also
Communes of the Marne department
Montagne de Reims Regional Natural Park

References

Jouylesreims